Thoracosaurus is an extinct genus of eusuchian crocodylomorph which existed during the Late Cretaceous and Early Paleocene in North America and Europe. The taxon had traditionally been thought to be related to the modern false gharial, largely because the nasal bones contact the premaxillae. Phylogenetic work starting in the 1990s instead supported affinities within Gavialoidea exclusive of such forms, although a 2018 tip dating study simultaneously using morphological, molecular (DNA sequencing), and stratigraphic (fossil age) data suggests that it might have been a non-crocodylian eusuchian. The genus contains the type species Thoracosaurus neocesariensis in North America, and what is either Thoracosaurus isorhynchus or Thoracosaurus macrorhynchus from Europe; a recent review argues that T. macrorhynchus is a junior synonym of T. isorhynchus, but it is unclear whether the type of T. isorhynchus allows differentiation of European and North American Thoracosaurus; if not, then T. isorhynchus would be a nomen dubium. A number of species have been referred to this genus, but most are dubious.

References 

Neosuchians
Late Cretaceous crocodylomorphs
Paleocene crocodylomorphs
Late Cretaceous first appearances
Cretaceous–Paleogene boundary
Paleocene extinctions
Cretaceous reptiles of North America
Paleocene reptiles of North America
Hell Creek fauna
Fossil taxa described in 1852
Taxa named by Joseph Leidy
Prehistoric pseudosuchian genera